AtariAge is a website focusing on classic Atari video games. The site features gaming news, historical archives, discussion forums, and an online store. It was founded in 1998.

Taking its name from the 1982–84 Atari Age magazine, the site also houses a comprehensive, searchable database of Atari video games, including manuals, packaging art, estimated rarity, screenshots, reviews, and other details, as well as an Atari Age magazine archive. The site is also home to a community of homebrew developers for Atari and other classic video game systems. Some of the homebrew games originally published by AtariAge have been included in official video game compilations such as Activision Anthology.

Notes

References

External links
 AtariAge.com
 Interview with Albert Yarusso about AtariAge 

Internet properties established in 1998